Serge-Alain Liri (born 23 March 1979 in Treichville, Abidjan) is an Ivorian footballer. He played for APOP Kinyras Peyias in Cyprus.

Honours
APOP Kinyras
 Cypriot Cup: 2008–09

References

External links

1979 births
Living people
Ivorian footballers
Tours FC players
CS Sedan Ardennes players
US Boulogne players
APOP Kinyras FC players
Ivorian expatriate footballers
Expatriate footballers in France
Expatriate footballers in Cyprus
Ligue 1 players
Ligue 2 players
Cypriot First Division players
Association football forwards
GSI Pontivy players
Footballers from Abidjan
Ivory Coast international footballers